Fazlabad-e Sofla (also Romanized as Faẕlābād-e Soflá; also known as Fallāḩābād-e Pā’īn and Fallāḩābād Pā’īn) is a village in Jolgeh Rural District, in the Central District of Behabad County, Yazd Province, Iran. At the 2006 census, its population was 69, in 24 families.

References 

Populated places in Behabad County